Modlife was a company owned by musician Tom DeLonge that used a customizable software platform to monetize the numerous aspects of a creative artist's work. Founded in 2007, Modlife created new revenue streams for content creators by rewarding fans with special products and experiences, including a high level of interactivity between artists and fans. In June 2014, the company was based in San Diego, California, United States.

History
Following the introduction of file-sharing technology—including Napster at inception—DeLonge and his Blink-182 bandmates were considering a "plan B" in regard to generating income from their music. The band's 1999 album, Enema of the State, had sold one million copies within two months of its release, but DeLonge explained in 2014: "Napster was just hitting and the epicenter of our fan base was suburbia where everyone had the newest Apple computer."

Then, in May 1999, DeLonge launched the Loserkids.com online retailer that promoted and monetized the lifestyle that was strongly associated with Blink-182 and its large number of fans. In 2014, the company explains that it sells "relevant action sports and music influenced brands online."

In 2005, DeLonge met Joe Brisbois  to develop the idea of making an interactive video game based on Angels & Airwaves music.  In addition to the video game concept, the two explored a variety of other ideas including what eventually became Modlife.  Modlife was launched in 2007 and, by this time, album sales were not providing a substantial income for musicians, while third-party distributors involved in the sale of concert tickets and merchandise were not overcoming the issue due to their sales percentages. DeLonge's initial intention was to use Modlife to launch the To The Stars concept, which was described in 2014 as a "transmedia" company that works in different media formats, including books, music and film. However, To The Stars was not launched until March 2014.

Following its inception, Modlife signed numerous prominent artists to its roster that, in 2014, includes Kanye West, Pearl Jam and Nine Inch Nails, as well as DeLonge's own musical projects, Blink-182 and Angels & Airwaves. Angels & Airwaves used the platform to further monetize a 2012 tour, whereby the band sold VIP packages for fans that doubled the income they received. In December 2014, DeLonge reported that direct-to-consumer multimedia packages sold via Modlife contributes 40 percent of revenue from each new Angel and Airwaves release.

Pearl Jam used Modlife to sell concert tickets directly to the members of its fan club, Ten Club, and used a lottery system provided by DeLonge's platform. The American tour promotion company, Live Nation, developed its own version of Modlife after witnessing the Pearl Jam experience.

After the launch of To The Stars was announced, DeLonge explained in a June 2014 interview that his new company was informed by the Modlife experience, and serves to fill a gap that became evident:

That [To The Stars] was me asking how you can monetize the arts because the music is free. We figured out by blending physical and digital products together, you're going to download the album but you still want the limited edition poster and the vinyl together. When we did that with Modlife, we had a good handle on what the business would be but not the art.

As of February 2017, the Modlife website is now defunct.

Services
In December 2014, Modlife was described by the company on its website in the following manner:

[A] customizable, direct-to-consumer technology that delivers a complete set of tools that seamlessly integrate a multi-level online business model. With our single account management system, both clients and customers alike can easily manage their online experience with a single login across multiple channels.

The platform offers the following services:

User account management
Customization
e-commerce
Digital & physical fulfillment
Product dev. & manufacturing
Direct-to-consume
Membership paywalls
Fanclub ticketing
VIP packages
Pay-per-view
Backend content management
Social engagement
Third-party integration
Mobile optimization
Statistics & reporting
Consulting
Mobile app development

User sites

In November 2008, the company launched "usersites," which allow registered users to create their own microsites within Modlife.  Each user can design their own page, post blogs, photos and videos, add friends, and communicate with other fans. Usersites also have a "Top Ten" section, where they add their favorite pieces of content from anywhere on Modlife, and recommend site content to friends.

Roster

Angels & Airwaves, November 2007
Timmy Curran, June 2008
Forever The Sickest Kids, July 2008
From First To Last, August 2008
The Color Fred, August 2008
Finch, September 2008
Jessica Chobot, October 2008
Runner Runner, November 2008
The Silent Comedy, December 2008
Transfer, December 2008
Louis XIV, February 2009
Mayday Parade, March 2009
Run Doris Run, March 2009
Alex Woodard, April 2009
Hit The Lights, April 2009
Keep A Breast, April 2009
Envy On The Coast, April 2009
Attack Attack!, April 2009
Korn, May 2009
Moon Rising, May 2009
From Jupiter, May 2009
Blink-182 Pre-Sale, May 2009
Honor Bright, June 2009
W.R.O.N.G, June 2009
I Know What I Saw, June 2009
Closure in Moscow, June 2009
Scary Kids Scaring Kids, June 2009
Of Mice & Men (band), July 2009
Family Force 5, July 2009
Maylene and the Sons of Disaster, July 2009
Ryan Russell, July 2009
The Vault July 2009
The White Stripes, July 2009,
The Raconteurs, July 2009
The Dead Weather, July 2009
Third Man Records, July 2009
Rat Sound, August 2009
Searchlight, August 2009
Macbeth Footwear, October 2009
Kanye West
Nine Inch Nails
Coheed and Cambria
Taking Back Sunday
Pearl Jam
The Offspring

References

Defunct social networking services
American music websites